Hansei University is a mid-sized Evangelical Christian University located in Gunpo City near Seoul, South Korea.

History

In 1953, Assemblies of God missionaries established the Full Gospel Bible College. In 1997, the name was changed to Hansei University and became a fully accredited university by the South Korean government. It is affiliated with Yoido Full Gospel Church.

Programs
It has currently nine departments: Theology, Media and Communication Arts, Business Administration, Humanities and Social Science, International Language, Information Technology, Art, Design, and Nursing  The university is widely recognized especially for choral music.  Regarded as one of the top choral music universities in Eastern Asia, Hansei University boasts a choral music faculty of six professor/conductors on top of its 40+ music faculty.  The university is planning to open an international school for choral music in 2015/16.  Composer Hyo-Won Woo has served on the university's faculty.

Notable alumni
Kim Jong-kook, (Turbo)
Cho Yong-gi
Choi Ja-shil

See also
List of colleges and universities in South Korea
Education in South Korea

References

External links 

 (in Korean)
 Hansei GEMI English Website

Universities and colleges in Gyeonggi Province
Educational institutions established in 1953
1953 establishments in South Korea
Evangelical universities and colleges